George Mitchell Neil (11 November 1874 – 22 December 1904) was an English association footballer who played as a defender.

Born in Poplar, London, Neil spent three seasons with Millwall Athletic playing mostly in their reserve team before signing for West Norwood in 1894. For two of his seasons, Neil was club captain. He was described as a "very accomplished full-back, who could play on either flank". Whilst still with West Norwood he played as a guest player for Thames Ironworks. The first occasion was one of the first ever games played under "electric light", at Hermit Road against West Bromwich Albion in March 1896. In October 1896 he played in the London League for West Norwood losing to Thames Ironworks. A press report of the time noted his performance as being of "worthy of special mention". The following week, on 24 October 1896, he made his Ironworks debut, in a London League game against Crouch End. Fixtures were infrequent for the side and by 1899 he had played only 18 games and scored one goal.

In 1899 he took over as club secretary from Francis Payne and arranged the important signings of Tom Bradshaw, Bill Joyce and Kenny McKay, all from Tottenham Hotspur. Concerned about costs, club owner Arnold Hills initially refused to approve the transfers. Hills had decided to raise capital for the parent company, Thames Ironworks and Shipbuilding Company, and to make the company a limited company. Part of this involved reorganizing the company football club. With the need now for Hills to satisfy shareholders, partly to save costs, Thames Ironworks folded to later become West Ham United. Neil was replaced as club secretary by Lew Bowen and would play only one more game for West Ham, on 13 October 1900 in a 2–0 home win against Watford, before his involvement with the club ended.

Neil died of consumption, at the age of 30, in December 1904.

Notes

References

1872 births
1904 deaths
Footballers from Poplar, London
English footballers
Association football defenders
Millwall F.C. players
West Norwood F.C. players
Thames Ironworks F.C. players
West Ham United F.C. players
Southern Football League players
West Ham United F.C. club secretaries
20th-century deaths from tuberculosis
Tuberculosis deaths in England